Johny is a 1993 Indian Malayalam period film directed by Sangeeth Sivan and starring Tarun Kumar and Santhi Krishna in lead roles.

Reception
Meera John Chakrabarthy of Sunday Times said "It's hard to pick holes in this film. The technique is brilliant and the story, wholesome and clean. Little wonder then that the Malayalam film Johny is coasting along, having picked up two Kerala state awards for the best children's film and the film critics' award, and has been entered in several International film festivals, among them, Finland, Chicago and Iran".

Awards
Kerala State Film Award for Best Children's Film

Cast
 Tarun Kumar	
Santhi Krishna

References

External links
 

1993 films
1990s Malayalam-language films
Films directed by Sangeeth Sivan